The 1976 United States presidential election was the 48th quadrennial presidential election. It was held on Tuesday, November 2, 1976. Democrat Jimmy Carter of Georgia defeated incumbent Republican President Gerald Ford from Michigan by a narrow victory of 297 electoral college votes to Ford's 240. This is the most recent presidential election, and the first since 1920, in which both major-party candidates for vice-president would go on to become the presidential nominees for their parties in later elections. As of 2023,  this is also the earliest presidential election where at least one of the candidates is still living.

President Richard Nixon had won the previous 1972 election, with Spiro Agnew as his running mate, but in 1973, Agnew resigned, and Ford was appointed as vice president. When Nixon resigned in 1974 in the wake of the Watergate scandal, Ford ascended to the presidency, becoming the first, and only, president to take office without having been elected as either president or vice president. The Watergate scandal badly damaged the entire Republican party and its election prospects throughout the remainder of the decade. Ford promised to continue Nixon's political agenda and govern as a moderate Republican, causing considerable backlash from the conservative wing of his party. This spurred former California governor Ronald Reagan to mount a significant challenge against him in the Republican primaries, in which Ford narrowly prevailed at the convention. Carter was little-known at the start of the Democratic primaries, but the former governor of Georgia emerged as the front-runner after his victories in the first set of primaries. Campaigning as a political moderate in his own party, and as a Washington, D. C., outsider, Carter defeated opponents such as Mo Udall and liberal California governor Jerry Brown to clinch the Democratic nomination.

Ford pursued a "Rose Garden strategy" in which he sought to portray himself as an experienced leader focused on fulfilling his role as chief executive. On the other hand, Carter emphasized his status as a reformer who was "untainted" by Washington. Saddled with a poor economy, the fall of South Vietnam, and his unpopular pardon of Nixon, Ford trailed by a wide margin in polls taken after Carter's formal nomination in July 1976. Ford's polling rebounded after a strong performance in the first presidential debate, and the race was close on election day.

Carter won a majority of the popular and electoral vote. He was able to carry several Midwestern and Northeastern swing states such as Ohio, Pennsylvania, and New York, as well as every state in the Democratic-dominated region of the South, except for Virginia and Oklahoma. Ford dominated the Western states. Despite the political climate of the United States being predominantly conservative-leaning in the years prior to the election, Carter was able to achieve victory largely off of the backlash of the Watergate scandal that still was deeply hurting Republican candidates. Jimmy Carter also remains the most recent Democratic candidate in presidential history to win a majority of the Southern states and to win a majority of counties nationwide. Ford won 27 states, the most states ever carried by a losing candidate. As mentioned before, both of the major party vice-presidential nominees, Walter Mondale in the 1984 and Bob Dole in the 1996, would later win their respective parties's presidential nominations, but they eventually lost in the general elections (respectively to incumbent presidents Ronald Reagan and Bill Clinton).

1976 was the last presidential election in which Democrats relied on the New Deal Coalition that united labor unions in urban centers, religious minorities (Jews, and Catholics), African Americans, southerners, and blue collar workers in the industrial Midwest, who had benefited from Democratic President Franklin D. Roosevelt's liberal, New Deal economic agenda since the Great Depression in the 1930s. Thus, Carter's win represented the last victory in a period of political dominance by the Democratic Party known as the Fifth Party System that had begun in 1932 and would end in 1980 with Carter's defeat by Reagan. Meanwhile, Ford's defeat marked the first time in 44 years that an incumbent president was voted out of office (after Herbert Hoover's loss in 1932). 

As of 2020, this remains the last time that the southern states of Alabama, Mississippi, South Carolina, and Texas voted for the Democratic candidate in a presidential election, and the last until 2008 in which North Carolina did so. This was also the last election where the winning candidate did not win a majority of the 51 jurisdictions that cast votes in the Electoral College (the 50 states plus the District of Columbia). Conversely, it remains the last time that a Democrat would win the presidency without carrying a number of modern blue states and swing states; namely, Washington, Oregon, California, Nevada, New Mexico, Illinois, Michigan, New Jersey, Connecticut, Vermont, New Hampshire, and Maine. And a Democrat would not win the presidency without carrying Iowa again until 2020. As such, this was the most recent presidential election in which a Democratic candidate would rely on a coalition of predominantly Southern states to win the presidency.

Nominations

Democratic Party 

The surprise winner of the 1976 Democratic presidential nomination was Jimmy Carter, a former state senator and governor of Georgia. When the primaries began, Carter was little-known at the national level, and many political pundits regarded a number of better-known candidates, such as Senator Henry M. Jackson from Washington, Representative Morris Udall from Arizona, Governor George Wallace of Alabama, and California Governor Jerry Brown, as the favorites for the nomination. However, in the wake of the Watergate scandal, Carter realized that his status as a Washington outsider, political centrist, and moderate reformer could give him an advantage over his better-known establishment rivals. Carter also took advantage of the record number of state primaries and caucuses in 1976, to eliminate his better-known rivals one-by-one.

Henry M. Jackson made a fateful decision not to compete in the early Iowa caucus and New Hampshire primary, which Jimmy Carter won after liberals split their votes among four other candidates. Though Jackson went on to win the Massachusetts and New York primaries, he was forced to quit the race on May 1, after losing the critical Pennsylvania primary to Carter by twelve percentage points. Carter then defeated Governor Wallace, his main conservative challenger, by a wide margin in the North Carolina primary, thus forcing Wallace to end his campaign. Representative Udall, a liberal, then became Carter's main challenger. He finished second to Carter in the New Hampshire, Massachusetts, Wisconsin, New York, Michigan, South Dakota, and Ohio primaries, and won the caucuses in his home state of Arizona, while running even with Carter in the New Mexico caucuses. However, the fact that Udall finished second to Carter in most of these races meant that Carter steadily accumulated more delegates for the nomination than he did.

As Carter closed in on the nomination, an "ABC" ("Anybody But Carter") movement started among Northern and Western liberal Democrats who worried that Carter's Southern upbringing would make him too conservative for the Democratic Party. The leaders of the "ABC" movement, Idaho Senator Frank Church and California Governor Jerry Brown, both announced their candidacies for the Democratic nomination, and defeated Carter in several late primaries. However, their campaigns started too late to prevent Carter from gathering the remaining delegates he needed to capture the nomination.

By June 1976, Carter had captured more than enough delegates to win the Democratic nomination. At the 1976 Democratic National Convention, Carter easily won the nomination on the first ballot; Udall finished in second place. Carter then chose Minnesota Senator Walter Mondale, a liberal as his running mate.

Republican Party 

Republican candidates

 Gerald Ford, President of the United States
 Ronald Reagan, former governor of California

The contest for the Republican Party's presidential nomination in 1976 was between two serious candidates: incumbent president Gerald Ford, a member of the party's moderate wing, and former governor of California Ronald Reagan, a member of the party's conservative wing. The presidential primary campaign between the two men was hard-fought and relatively even; by the start of the Republican Convention in August 1976, the race for the nomination was still too close to call. Ford defeated Reagan by a narrow margin on the first ballot at the 1976 Republican National Convention in Kansas City, and chose Senator Bob Dole from Kansas as his running mate in the place of incumbent vice president Nelson Rockefeller, who had announced the previous year that he was not interested in being considered for the vice presidential nomination. Since Rockefeller was the second vice president to assume the office as ruled by the Section 2 of the 25th Amendment and the other one who achieved this feat was Ford who was nominated in 1976, this made Rockefeller the only vice president never contested in the general election both as presidential and vice presidential nominee. All presidents had contested for the office, either as president or vice president, with the exception of Ford, who appeared only after being president and all other vice presidents other than Ford had contested for the office. The 1976 Republican Convention was the last political convention to open with the presidential nomination still being undecided until the actual balloting at the convention.

Others 
 Roger MacBride, who had gained fame in the 1972 election as a faithless elector, ran as the nominee of the Libertarian Party.
 Eugene McCarthy, a former Democratic Senator from Minnesota, ran as an independent candidate.
 Ben Bubar, Prohibition Party nominee.
 Frank Zeidler, former mayor of Milwaukee, Wisconsin, ran as the nominee of Socialist Party USA, which was founded in 1973 in a split with Socialist Party of America.
 Gus Hall, four-time Communist Party candidate
 Lester Maddox, the former Democratic Governor of Georgia (and Lieutenant Governor under Carter), ran as the nominee of the American Independent Party

General election

Fall campaign 

One of the advantages Ford held over Carter as the general election campaign began was his presidential privilege to preside over events celebrating the United States Bicentennial; this often resulted in favorable publicity for Ford. These included the Washington, D. C., fireworks display on the Fourth of July, which was televised nationally. On July 7, 1976, the President and First Lady served as hosts at a White House state dinner for Queen Elizabeth II and Prince Philip of the United Kingdom, which was televised on the Public Broadcasting Service (PBS) network. These events were part of Ford's "Rose Garden" strategy to win the election, meaning that instead of appearing as a typical politician, Ford presented himself as a "tested leader" who was busily fulfilling the role of national leader and chief executive. Not until October did Ford leave the White House to actively campaign across the nation.

Carter ran as a reformer who was "untainted" by Washington political scandals, which many voters found attractive in the wake of the Watergate scandal that had led to President Richard Nixon's resignation. Ford, although personally unconnected with Watergate, was seen by many as too close to the discredited Nixon administration, especially after he granted Nixon a presidential pardon for any crimes he might have committed during his term of office. Ford's pardon of Nixon caused his popularity, as measured by public opinion polls, to plummet. Ford's refusal to explain his reasons for pardoning Nixon publicly (he would do so in his memoirs several years later), also hurt his image.

Ford unsuccessfully asked Congress to end the 1950s-era price controls on natural gas, which had caused a dwindling of American natural gas reserves after the 1973 oil crisis. Carter stated during his campaign that he opposed the ending of the price controls and thought such a move would be "disastrous".

After the Democratic National Convention, Carter held a 33-point lead over Ford in the polls. However, as the campaign continued, the race greatly tightened. During the campaign Playboy magazine published a controversial interview with Carter; in the interview, Carter admitted to having "lusted in my heart" for women other than his wife and used the word "screw," which cut into his support among women and evangelical Christians. On September 23, Ford performed well in what was the first televised presidential debate since 1960. Polls taken after the debate showed that most viewers felt that Ford was the winner. Carter was also hurt by Ford's charges that he lacked the necessary experience to be an effective national leader and that he was vague on many issues.

However, Ford also committed a costly blunder in the campaign that halted his momentum. During the second presidential debate on October 6, Ford stumbled when he asserted that "there is no Soviet domination of Eastern Europe, and there never will be under a Ford administration". He added that he did not "believe that the Poles consider themselves dominated by the Soviet Union", and made the same claim with regard to Yugoslavia and Romania (Yugoslavia was not a Warsaw Pact member). Ford refused to retract his statement for almost a week after the debate, causing his surge in the polls to stall and allowing Carter to maintain a slight lead in the polls.

A vice-presidential debate, the first ever formal one of its kind, between Bob Dole and Walter Mondale also hurt the Republican ticket when Dole asserted that military unpreparedness on the part of Democratic presidents was responsible for all of the wars the U.S. had fought in the 20th century. Dole, a World War II veteran, noted that in every 20th-century war, from World War I to the Vietnam War, a Democrat had been president. Dole then pointed out that the number of U.S. casualties in "Democrat wars" was roughly equal to the population of Detroit. Many voters felt that Dole's criticism was unfairly harsh, and that his dispassionate delivery made him seem cold. Years later, Dole would remark that he regretted the comment, believing that it had hurt the Republican ticket. One factor that did help Ford in the closing days of the campaign was a series of popular television appearances he did with Joe Garagiola, Sr., a retired baseball star for the St. Louis Cardinals and a well-known announcer for NBC Sports. Garagiola and Ford appeared in a number of shows in several large cities. During the show, Garagiola would ask Ford questions about his life and beliefs; the shows were so informal, relaxed, and laid-back that some television critics labelled them the "Joe and Jerry Show". Ford and Garagiola obviously enjoyed one another's company, and they remained friends after the election was over.

Presidential debates 

There were three presidential debates and one vice presidential debate during the 1976 general election.

Results 

Despite his campaign's blunders, Ford managed to close the remaining gap in the polls, and by election day, the race was judged to be even. It took most of that night and the following morning to determine the winner. It was not until 3:30 am EST, that the NBC television network was able to declare that Carter had carried Mississippi and had thus accumulated more than the 270 electoral votes needed to win (seconds later, ABC News also declared Carter the winner, based on projections for Carter in Wisconsin and Hawaii, while CBS News announced Carter's victory at 3:45 am). Carter defeated Ford by two percentage points in the national popular vote.

The electoral vote was the closest since 1916; Carter carried 23 states, with 297 electoral votes, while Ford won 27 states, with 240 electoral votes (one elector, future state Senator Mike Padden from Washington state, pledged to Ford, voted for Reagan). Carter's victory came primarily from his near-sweep of the South (he lost only Virginia and Oklahoma), and his narrow victories in large Northern states such as New York, Ohio, and Pennsylvania. Ford did well in the West, carrying every state in that region, except for Hawaii. The most tightly contested state in the election was Oregon, which Ford won by under 2,000 votes.

By percentage of the vote, the states that secured Carter's victory were Wisconsin (1.68% margin) and Ohio (.27% margin). Had Ford won these states and all other states he carried, he would have won the presidency. The 27 states he won were, and still are, the most states ever carried by a losing candidate for president. Had Ford won the election, the provisions of the 22nd amendment would have disqualified him from running in 1980, as he served more than two years of Nixon's second term.

Records 

Carter was the first Democrat since John F. Kennedy in 1960 to carry the states of the Deep South (Bill Clinton was the only Democrat since 1976 to carry more than one state from the Deep South, doing so in both 1992 and 1996), and the first since Lyndon B. Johnson in 1964 to carry a majority of all southern states. Carter performed very strongly in his home state of Georgia, carrying 66.7% of the vote and every county in the state. His winning of 23 states was only the first time since the 1960 election, and the second time in history, that the winner of the election won fewer than half the states. His 50.1% of the vote was the only time since 1964 that a Democrat managed to obtain an absolute majority of the popular vote in a presidential election, until Barack Obama won 52.9% of the vote in 2008. Carter is one of six Democrats since the American Civil War to obtain an absolute majority of the popular vote, the others being Samuel J. Tilden, Franklin D. Roosevelt, Lyndon B. Johnson, Barack Obama, and Joe Biden.

This election represents the last time to date that Texas, Mississippi, Alabama, or South Carolina would vote Democratic, and the last time North Carolina would vote Democratic until 2008, as well as the last time Florida voted Democratic until 1996, and the last time Arkansas, Delaware, Kentucky, Louisiana, Missouri, Ohio, Pennsylvania, and Tennessee voted Democratic until 1992. It is also the last time in which Shasta, Yuba, Placer, El Dorado, and Madera Counties in California, Adams and Brown in Ohio, Brazoria and McLennan Counties in Texas, Madison County in Alabama, Brevard County in Florida, Warren County in Kentucky, and St. Mary's County in Maryland would vote Democratic.

This election was the last time that a Democrat won the presidency without winning a number of modern blue states and swing states, specifically California, Connecticut, Illinois, Maine, Michigan, Nevada, New Hampshire, New Jersey, New Mexico, Oregon, Vermont, and Washington. This is the only time a Democrat has won without New Mexico, as well as the only time it voted for a candidate who lost the popular vote. Similarly, it is one of only three instances in which a Democrat won without Nevada (the others being the two elections of Grover Cleveland in 1884 and 1892).

It was the first time in exactly 100 years (since 1876) when Florida and Virginia supported different candidates, and the first time since Oklahoma statehood in 1907 when Oklahoma and Tennessee did so.

Statistics 

Source (Popular Vote): 

Source (Electoral Vote):

Results by state 

This election represents the second time that the winning candidate has received a majority of the electoral votes, although the second-place candidate carried a majority of the states.  It had previously happened in the 1960 election. The "margin" column shows the difference between the two leading candidates, and the "swing" column shows the margin swing from the respective party's nominee from 1972 to 1976.

Maine allowed its electoral votes to be split between candidates. Two electoral votes were awarded to the winner of the statewide race and one electoral vote to the winner of each congressional district. Ford won all four votes.

Close states 

States where margin of victory was under 1% (35 electoral votes):
Oregon, 0.16% (1,713 votes)
Ohio, 0.27% (11,116 votes)
 Maine's 2nd Congressional District, 0.28% (620 votes)
Maine, 0.84% (4,041 votes)

States where margin of victory was under 5% (264 electoral votes):
Iowa, 1.01% (12,932 votes)
Oklahoma, 1.21% (13,266 votes)
Virginia, 1.34% (22,658 votes)
Maine's 1st Congressional District, 1.36% (3,421 votes)
South Dakota, 1.48% (4,437 votes)
Wisconsin, 1.68% (35,245 votes)  (tipping point state)
California, 1.78% (139,960 votes)
Mississippi, 1.88% (14,463 votes)
Illinois, 1.97% (92,974 votes)
New Jersey, 2.16% (65,035 votes)
New Mexico, 2.47% (10,271 votes)
Hawaii, 2.53% (7,372 votes)
Pennsylvania, 2.66% (123,073 votes)
Texas, 3.17% (129,019 votes)
Missouri, 3.63% (70,944 votes)
Washington, 3.88% (60,409 votes)
Nevada, 4.36% (8,794 votes)
New York, 4.43% (288,767 votes)

States where margin of victory was more than 5%, but less than 10% (105 electoral votes):
Connecticut, 5.16% (71,366 votes)
Florida, 5.29% (166,469 votes)
Michigan, 5.39% (197,028 votes)
Delaware, 5.41% (12,765 votes)
Louisiana, 5.78% (73,919 votes)
North Dakota, 5.86% (17,392 votes)
Maryland, 6.08% (86,951 votes)
Kentucky, 7.18% (83,865 votes)
Montana, 7.44% (24,444 votes)
Kansas, 7.55% (72,331 votes)
Indiana, 7.62% (169,244 votes)

Statistics 

Counties with Highest Percent of Vote (Democratic)
 Banks County, Georgia 87.85%
 Starr County, Texas 87.25%
 Brantley County, Georgia 86.50%
 Duval County, Texas 86.36%
 Wilcox County, Georgia 86.15%

Counties with Highest Percent of Vote (Republican)
 Jackson County, Kentucky 79.80%
 Owsley County, Kentucky 77.03%
 Hooker County, Nebraska 76.35%
 Ottawa County, Michigan 74.12%
 Arthur County, Nebraska 73.66%

Voter demographics 

Source: CBS News/New York Times interviews with 12,782 voters as they left the polls, as reported in The New York Times, November 9, 1980, p. 28, and in further analysis. The 1976 data are from CBS News interviews.

See also 
Presidency of Jimmy Carter
History of the United States (1964–1980)
1976 United States House of Representatives elections
1976 United States Senate elections
1976 United States gubernatorial elections
Inauguration of Jimmy Carter

Notes

References

Further reading 
 Chester, Edward W  A guide to political platforms (1977) online
 Johnstone, Andrew, and Andrew Priest, eds.  US Presidential Elections and Foreign Policy: Candidates, Campaigns, and Global Politics from FDR to Bill Clinton (2017) pp 229–249. online

 
 
 
 Williams, Daniel K. The Election of the Evangelical: Jimmy Carter, Gerald Ford, and the Presidential Contest of 1976 (University Press of Kansas, 2020) online review

External links 
 The Election Wall's 1976 Election Video Page
 1976 popular vote by counties
 1976 popular vote by states (with bar graphs)
 Campaign commercials from the 1976 election
 Election of 1976 in Counting the Votes 

 
1976
Jimmy Carter
Gerald Ford
Walter Mondale
Bob Dole
November 1976 events in the United States